Francesco Baccini (born  4 October 1960) is an Italian singer-songwriter.

Background 
Born in Genoa, Baccini made his official debut in 1988 with the stage name Espressione Musica, with "Mamma dammi i soldi", the closing theme song of the  38th edition of the Sanremo Music Festival. Put under contract by Caterina Caselli, in 1989 he released his first album, Cartoons, which was both a critical and commercial success. In 1990 he won the Festivalbar competition and peaked the Italian hit parade with the song "Sotto questo sole", recorded together with the band Ladri di biciclette. In 1997 he entered the competition at the Sanremo Music Festival,  ranking eleventh with the song "Senza tu". In 2004 he toured with "Orco Loco", subtitled as “A Clipcomedy with Songs”, a recital in which he performed both as a singer and, for the first time, as an actor.

Discography
Album 
 
 1989 - Cartoons 
 1990 - Il pianoforte non è il mio forte 
 1992 - Nomi e cognomi 
 1993 - Nudo 
 1996 - Baccini a colori  
 1997 - Baccini and Best Friends  
 1999 - Nostra signora degli autogrill
 2001 - Forza Francesco!
 2005 - Stasera teatro
 2006 - Fra..gi..le
 2007 - Dalla parte di Caino
 2008 - Uniti (with Povia)
 2011 - Baccini canta Tenco
 2017 - Chewing-gum Blues (with Sergio Caputo)

References

External links  

 

 

1960 births
Musicians from Genoa
Italian pop singers
Italian male singer-songwriters
Italian singer-songwriters
Living people